Loxopholis parietalis, the common root lizard, is a species of lizard in the family Gymnophthalmidae. It is found in Colombia, Venezuela, Ecuador, and Peru.

References

Loxopholis
Reptiles described in 1886
Taxa named by Edward Drinker Cope